Brusselian (also known as , , ,  or ) is a near-extinct dialect native to Brussels, Belgium. It is essentially a heavily-Francisized Brabantian Dutch dialect that incorporates a sprinkle of Spanish loanwords dating back to the rule of the Low Countries by the Habsburgs (1519–1713).

Brusselian was widely spoken in the Marolles/Marollen neighbourhood of the City of Brussels until the 20th century. It still survives among a small minority of inhabitants called Brusseleers (or Brusseleirs), many of them quite bi- and multilingual in French and Dutch.

The Royal Theatre Toone, a folkloric theatre of marionettes in central Brussels, still puts on puppet plays in Brusselian.

Toponymy
Historically a working-class neighbourhood, it has subsequently become a fashionable part of the city.

Brusselian is described as "totally indecipherable to the foreigner (which covers everyone not born in the Marolles), which is probably a good thing as it is richly abusive."

What is Brusselian?

There is a dispute and confusion about the meaning of Brusselian, which many consider to be a neighbourhood jargon distinct from a larger Brussels Dutch dialect, while others use the term "Marols" as an overarching substitute term for that citywide dialect.  According to Jeanine Treffers-Daller, “the dialect has a tremendous prestige and a lot of myths are doing the rounds.”

The Brusselian word zwanze is commonly applied by speakers of French and Dutch to denote a sarcastic form of folk humour considered typical of Brussels.

Origins
A local version of the Brabantian dialect was originally spoken in Brussels. When the Kingdom of Belgium was established in 1830 after the Belgian Revolution, French was established as the only official language of the kingdom. French was therefore primarily used amongst nobility (however some in the historic towns of Flanders were bilingual and stayed attached to the old Flemish national literature), the middle class and a significant portion of the population whose secondary education had only been delivered in French.

French then gradually spread through the working classes, especially after the establishment of compulsory education in Belgium from 1914 for children aged between six and fourteen years. Primary school education was given in Dutch in the Flemish region and in French in the Walloon region. Secondary education was only given in French throughout Belgium. Drained by the personal needs of the administration, many new working class arrivals from the south of Belgium, again increased the presence of French in Brussels. Informal language was from then on a mixture of Romance and Germanic influences, which adapted into becoming Brusselian.

Nowadays, the Brussels-Capital Region is officially bilingual in French and Dutch, even though French has become the predominant language of the city.

Examples
An example of Brusselian is:

Brusselian and The Adventures of Tintin

Bordurian, for example, has as one of its words the Brusselian-based  meaning "mister" (cf. Dutch ). In the original French, the fictional Arumbaya language of San Theodoros is another incarnation of Brusselian.

References

Notes

Bibliography
 
 
 
 

Dutch dialects
Culture in Brussels
Languages of Belgium
Tintin
City colloquials